Ian McPhee (born 31 January 1961 in Perth, Scotland) is a Scottish former professional footballer who spent most of his career with Forfar Athletic.

Career
McPhee was with Celtic as a youth but failed to make a senior appearance and moved to Forfar, where he spent nine years. McPhee moved to Dundee United in his mid-twenties but managed only a dozen league appearances during his time at Tannadice and dropped down a division to join Airdrieonians partway through the 1988–89 season. McPhee featured in over eighty league matches for the Diamonds before rejoining Forfar in 1991. McPhee became player/manager in 1996, taking over from Tommy Campbell. During his four-year managerial spell, McPhee achieved promotion in the remainder of his first season and kept them in the Second Division the following season. The club were relegated in the 1998–99 season but McPhee won promotion at the first time of asking. In November 2000, with the club lying bottom, McPhee ended his long association with the Loons by "mutual consent".

Honours

Manager
Forfar Athletic
Scottish Third Division promotion : 1996–97
Forfarshire Cup : 1997–98

References

External links
 

1961 births
Footballers from Perth, Scotland
Living people
Scottish footballers
Celtic F.C. players
Forfar Athletic F.C. players
Dundee United F.C. players
Airdrieonians F.C. (1878) players
Scottish Football League players
Scottish football managers
Forfar Athletic F.C. managers
Scottish Football League managers
Association football midfielders